Ludmila, Ludmilla, Liudmila, Liudmyla, Lyudmila, or Lyudmyla (Cyrillic: Людмила,  Lyudmila) may refer to:

People
 Ludmila (given name) a Slavic female given name (including a list of people with the name) 
 Ludmila da Silva (born 1994), Brazilian footballer, commonly known as Ludmila
 Ludmilla (singer), Brazilian singer and songwriter Ludmila Oliveira da Silva (born 1995)
 Anna Ludmilla, American ballerina born Jean Marie Kaley (1903–1990)

Arts and literature
 a title character of Ruslan and Ludmila, a poem by Alexandr Pushkin
 a title character of Ruslan and Lyudmila (opera), by Mikhail Glinka
 the title character of Ludmila's Broken English, a 2006 book by D.B.C. Pierre
 the title character of Saint Ludmila (oratorio), by Antonín Dvořák

Places
 Ludmilla, Northern Territory, Australia, a suburb of the city of Darwin
 675 Ludmilla, an asteroid

Other uses
 Ludmila, nickname of DR Class 130 family locomotive